is the seventh studio album by Japanese rock band Radwimps. It was released on December 11, 2013 by EMI Records Japan. The album reached #2 rank first week in Oricon rankings. It charted for 29 weeks. The album was certified platinum by the Recording Industry Association of Japan.

Track listing

References

2013 albums
Radwimps albums